Solariorbis is a genus of gastropods belonging to the family Tornidae.

Species
 
 Solariorbis allomphalus  Pilsbry & Olsson, 1952
 Solariorbis ametabolus  Pilsbry & Olsson, 1952
 Solariorbis annulatus  (Carpenter, 1857)
 Solariorbis antillensis De Jong & Coomans, 1988
 Solariorbis arnoldi Bartsch, 1927
 Solariorbis bailyanus  Pilsbry & Olsson, 1952
 Solariorbis bakeri (A. M. Strong & Hertlein, 1939)
 Solariorbis bartschi (Vanatta, 1913)
 Solariorbis blakei (Rehder, 1944)
 Solariorbis callusa (Laseron, 1958)
 Solariorbis carianus  Pilsbry & Olsson, 1952
 Solariorbis carinatus  (Carpenter, 1857)
 Solariorbis carinulatus  (Carpenter, 1857)
 Solariorbis concinnus (C. B. Adams, 1852)
 † Solariorbis decussatus (F. Sandberger, 1859) 
 † Solariorbis depressus (I. Lea, 1833) †
 Solariorbis ditropis  Pilsbry & Olsson, 1952
 Solariorbis elegans  Pilsbry & Olsson, 1952
 Solariorbis elegans (Olsson & McGinty, 1958)
 † Solariorbis eugenes Pilsbry, 1953 
 Solariorbis exquisitus  Pilsbry & Olsson, 1952
 Solariorbis gibraleonis  Pilsbry & Olsson, 1952
 Solariorbis guianensis van Regteren Altena, 1966
 Solariorbis hambachi (A. M. Strong & Hertlein, 1939)
 Solariorbis hannai (A. M. Strong & Hertlein, 1939)
 Solariorbis hondurasensis (Vanatta, 1913)
 Solariorbis hypolius  Pilsbry & Olsson, 1952
 Solariorbis infracarinatus (Gabb, 1881)
 Solariorbis lineopunctatus Rubio, Fernández-Garcés & Rolán, 2011 
 Solariorbis liriope (Bartsch, 1911)
 Solariorbis miguelensis  Pilsbry & Olsson, 1952
 Solariorbis millepunctatus (Pilsbry & Olsson, 1945)
 Solariorbis minutus (C. B. Adams, 1852)
 Solariorbis mooreanus (Vanatta, 1904)
 Solariorbis multistriatus (A. E. Verrill, 1884)
 Solariorbis narinensis  Pilsbry & Olsson, 1952
 † Solariorbis oostrombusensis Lozouet, 2015 
 Solariorbis pachyston (Verco, 1907)
 Solariorbis pacificus  Pilsbry & Olsson, 1952
 Solariorbis pellucidus  Pilsbry & Olsson, 1952
 Solariorbis petitii (P. Fischer, 1857)
 Solariorbis punctostriatus Rubio, Rolán & H. G. Lee, 2011
 Solariorbis pyricallosus  (Carpenter, 1857)
 Solariorbis regularis (C. B. Adams, 1852)
 Solariorbis ruris Rubio, Fernández-Garcés & Rolán, 2011
 Solariorbis schumoi (Vanatta, 1913)
 Solariorbis seminudus (C. B. Adams, 1852)
 Solariorbis semipunctus D. R. Moore, 1965
 Solariorbis shimeri (Clapp, 1914)
 Solariorbis solidus Rubio, Fernández-Garcés & Rolán, 2011
 Solariorbis terminalis (Pilsbry & McGinty, 1946)
 Solariorbis truncatus (Gabb, 1881)
 † Solariorbis turoniensis (Glibert, 1949) 

Synonyms
 Solariorbis aguayoi Corgan, 1968: synonym of Vitrinella aguayoi (Corgan, 1968) (original combination)
 Solariorbis basilissus Pilsbry, 1953 †: synonym of Solariorbis mooreanus (Vanatta, 1904)
 Solariorbis contractus (Vanatta, 1913): synonym of Vitrinella contracta (Vanatta, 1913)
 Solariorbis corylus Olsson & McGinty, 1958: synonym of Solariorbis truncatus (Gabb, 1881)
 Solariorbis decipiens Olsson & McGinty, 1958: synonym of Anticlimax crassilabris (Aguayo & Borro, 1946)
 Solariorbis euzonus Pilsbry & McGinty, 1950: synonym of Solariorbis infracarinatus (Gabb, 1881)
 Solariorbis funiculus (Dall, 1892): synonym of Vitrinella funiculus (Dall, 1892)

References

External links
 Conrad, T. A. (1865). Catalogue of the Eocene and Oligocene Testacea of the United States. American Journal of Conchology. 1(1): 1-35
 Rubio, F.; Fernández-Garcés, R.; Rolán, E. (2011). The family Tornidae (Gastropoda, Rissooidea) in the Caribbean and neighboring areas. Iberus. 29(2), 1-230

Tornidae